The year 1812 in architecture involved some significant events.

Buildings and structures

Buildings

 July 6 – The Laigh Milton Viaduct, built to carry the Kilmarnock and Troon Railway in Scotland, is officially opened.
 October 10 – The Theatre Royal, Drury Lane, in London, designed by Benjamin Dean Wyatt, the fourth theatre on the site, hosts its first production.
 Original Scottish Law Courts, Edinburgh, designed by Robert Reid, completed.
 Custom House, Leith, Edinburgh, designed by Robert Reid, completed.
 HM Prison Perth, Scotland, designed by Robert Reid, completed.
 The original Breidenbacher Hof hotel in Düsseldorf, Germany, opens to the public. (It is destroyed by bombing in 1943 and later rebuilt at a different location.)
 The Egyptian Hall in Piccadilly, London, designed by P. F. Robinson, is completed (demolished in 1905).
 St. John's Cathedral (Belize City) is completed, the first church to be built in the colony of British Honduras.
 The Flag Tower of Hanoi is completed.
 Temple of Diana, Valtice, Moravia, designed by Joseph Hardtmuth, is built.
 The Mahmoudiya Mosque in Jaffa, modern-day Israel, is completed.
 Castle Cottage, Newport-on-Tay, Scotland, is built.

Awards
 Grand Prix de Rome, architecture: Tilman-François Suys.

Publications
 William Adam's Vitruvius Scoticus is published posthumously by his grandson William Adam of Blair Adam in Edinburgh.

Births
 January 10 – Georg Hermann Nicolai, German architect and academic (died 1881)
 March 1 – Augustus Pugin, English Gothic Revival architect, designer, artist and critic (died 1852)
 March 2 – Samuel Sanders Teulon, English Gothic Revival architect (died 1873)
 September 8 – Matthew Ellison Hadfield, English Gothic Revival architect (died 1885)
 September 13 – John McMurtry, American builder and architect (died 1890)
 October 21 – Richard Cromwell Carpenter, English Gothic Revival architect (died 1855)
 November 9 – Paul Abadie, French architect and building restorer (died 1884)

Deaths
 January 9 bapt. – Eduard van der Nüll, Viennese architect (suicide 1868)
 November 7 – Matvey Kazakov, Russian neoclassical architect (born 1738)
 date unknown – Cosimo Morelli, Italian neoclassical architect (born 1732)

References

Architecture
Years in architecture
19th-century architecture